The Alexandria train collision occurred on 11 August 2017 near Khorshid station in the suburbs of the eastern edge of Alexandria, Egypt.

Crash
Two trains – one traveling from Port Said and the other from Cairo – crashed one into the rear of the other at 2:15 pm local time, killing at least 41 people and injuring another 179.

Reactions
On 11 August, President Abdel Fattah el-Sisi expressed his condolences for the victims and ordered government bodies to form an investigative task force to identify the cause of the accident and hold those responsible to account.

References 

2017 in Egypt
21st century in Alexandria
August 2017 events in Egypt
Railway accidents in 2017
Train collisions in Egypt